Girolamo de Francisco (died 1530) was a Roman Catholic prelate who served as Bishop of Mazara del Vallo (1526–1530).

Biography
On 12 December 1526, Girolamo de Francisco was appointed by Pope Clement VII as Bishop of Mazara del Vallo. He served as Bishop of Mazara del Vallo until his death in 1530.

See also
Catholic Church in Italy

References

External links and additional sources
 (for Chronology of Bishops) 
 (for Chronology of Bishops) 

1530 deaths
Bishops appointed by Pope Clement VII
16th-century Roman Catholic bishops in Sicily